Apel is a surname. Notable people with the surname include:

Erich Apel (1917–1965), German SED politician
Hans Apel (1932–2011), German SPD politician
Johann August Apel (1771–1816), German writer
Karl-Otto Apel (1922–2017), German philosopher
Katrin Apel (born 1973), former biathlete
Willi Apel (1893–1988), German-U.S. musicologist

German-language surnames